Lorna Lesley (born 1959, in Yorkshire) is an Australian actress, who has worked extensively in theatre, film and TV during the 1970s, 1980s and 1990s period.

Filmography 

FILM

TELEVISION

References

External links

20th-century Australian actresses
English emigrants to Australia
1959 births
Living people